Chervlyonoye is a rural locality (a selo) in Svetloyarsky District, Volgograd Oblast, Russia. The population was 2,314 as of 2010. There are 23 streets.

Geography 
Chervlyonoye is located 37 km west of Svetly Yar (the district's administrative centre) by road. Kanalnaya is the nearest rural locality.

References 

Rural localities in Svetloyarsky District